Chrome alum or Chromium(III) potassium sulfate is the potassium double sulfate of chromium. Its chemical formula is KCr(SO4)2 and it is commonly found in its dodecahydrate form as KCr(SO4)2·12(H2O).  It is used in leather tanning.

Production and properties

Chromium alum is produced from chromate salts or from ferrochromium alloys.  Concentrated aqueous solutions of potassium dichromate can be reduced, usually with sulfur dioxide but also with alcohols or formaldehyde, in the presence of sulfuric acid at temperatures <40 °C.  Alternatively and less commonly, ferrochromium alloys can be dissolved in sulfuric acid and, after precipitation of the ferrous sulfate, the chrome alum crystallizes upon addition of potassium sulfate. Chromium alum crystallizes in regular octahedra with flattened corners and is very soluble in water. The solution reddens litmus and is an astringent. Aqueous solutions are dark violet and turns green when it is heated above 50 °C.  In addition to the dodecahydrate, the hexahydrate KCr(SO4)2·6H2O, dihydrate KCr(SO4)2·2H2O, and the monohydrate KCr(SO4)2·H2O are known.

Uses
Chromium alum is used in the tanning of leather as chromium(III) stabilizes the leather by cross linking the collagen fibers within the leather. However, this application is obsolete because the simpler chromium(III) sulfate is preferred.

It was also used in gelatine emulsions in photographic film as hardener.

References

Sulfates
Potassium compounds
Chromium(III) compounds
Coordination complexes
Double salts